Eupithecia castellata is a moth in the  family Geometridae. It is found from California and Nevada to Washington.

The wingspan is 21 mm.

References

Moths described in 1944
castellata
Moths of North America